Lettie G. Howard, formerly Mystic C and Caviare, is a wooden Fredonia schooner built in 1893 in Essex, Massachusetts, USA.  This type of craft was commonly used by American offshore fishermen, and is believed to be the last surviving example of its type.  She was declared a National Historic Landmark in 1989.  She is now based at the South Street Seaport Museum in New York City.

Description and history
Lettie G. Howard is a two-masted wooden-hulled fishing schooner. She has a gross tonnage of 59.74 and a net tonnage of 56.76. Her hull has a frame of oak timbers, covered in treenailed pine planking. The belowdecks area was historically divided into a forecastle third where the crew quarters were located, the main fish hold in the center, and a smaller storage area aft.

The schooner was built in 1893 at a shipyard in Essex, Massachusetts by noted shipbuilder Arthur D. Story.  Story was one of four co-owners of the ship, which operated on the Georges Banks until 1901, when she ran aground on a shoal near Gurnet Point, Massachusetts.  In 1902, she was sold to E.E. Saunders of Pensacola, Florida, who used her to fish for red snapper off the coast of the Yucatan Peninsula.  She was taken out of service in 1922, and rebuilt in 1923, given the name Mystic C.  In 1966, she was sold to Historic Ship Associates of Gloucester, Massachusetts, who converted her into a museum ship, mistakenly named Caviare after an 1891 ship of that name.  That museum failed, and in 1968 she was sold to the South Street Seaport Museum and refinished. She was restored in 1991 and is currently certified by the US Coast Guard as a Sailing School Vessel training and working museum ship.  She currently sails along the Northeast seaboard.  She underwent extensive shipyard repairs in Portland, Maine in the second half of 2013.

In 2014, the schooner received two awards relating to her programming and historic restoration efforts; the Tall Ships America 2014 Sail Training Vessel of the Year Award, and the New York Landmarks Conservancy Lucy G. Moses Preservation Award.

In 2015, the vessel and crew took third place in the Gloucester Schooner Festival's Esperanto Cup. Part of the crew was made up of High school students, from the New York Harbor School, and the MAST Academy.

In 2018, the schooner sailed to Lake Erie and is currently hosted by the Flagship Niagara League, offering sailing tours from the Erie Maritime Museum in Erie, PA.

See also
 List of schooners
 List of National Historic Landmarks in New York City
 National Register of Historic Places listings in Manhattan below 14th Street

References

External links

 Biography of Lettie G. Howard Barron, biography and burial information about the woman for whom the Lettie G. Howard was named.

1893 ships
National Historic Landmarks in New York (state)
Ships on the National Register of Historic Places in Manhattan
South Street Seaport
Essex, Massachusetts
Museum ships in New York (state)